The Blessed Gamelbert was a Christian priest, who worked in the 8th century in the area of the present Deggendorf in Bavaria in Germany.

Life
Gamelbert is said to have been of noble descent and a lord of Michaelsbuch. In the mid-8th century he acquired from Duke Tassilo III a piece of woodland on the opposite bank of the Danube between Mariaposching and Deggendorf, for which he had to pay a tax known as the Medema. From this was derived the name of Metten both for the place itself and for the monastery, Metten Abbey, that was founded there.

The first abbot was Gamelbert's godson Utto, who directed the construction of the monastery from his hermitage (the present Uttobrunn). In 766 twelve monks arrived from Reichenau Abbey as the first official occupants, although the place was well settled by then

Other
In art, Gamelbert is represented as a priest or as a pilgrim surrounded by birds. His feast is celebrated on 17 January.

Grave finds from Uttenkofen near Michaelsbuch have been dated to the late 7th or early 8th century and have been associated with the founding family of Metten Abbey.

Further reading
Becker, H. 1971. "Gamelbertus von Michaelsbuch." Beiträge zur Geschichte des Bistums Regensburg 5: 7–21.
Fink, Wilhelm. 1939. "Der selige Gamelbert." In Zwölfhundert Jahre Bistum Regensburg. Regensburg. 223 ff.
Ponschab, Bernhard. 1910. Die seligen Utto und Gamelbert. Die Geschichte ihrer Verehrung und ihres Lebens. Regensburg.
Prinz, Friedrich. 1962. "Die Anfänge der Benediktinerabtei Metten." Zeitschrift für bayerische Landesgeschichte 25: 20–32.

External links
 A Brief Traditional Account of Gamelbert and Utto

Vita Gamalberti, ed. W. Levison. MGH Scriptores rerum Merov. 7: Passiones vitaeque sanctorum aevi Merovingici (V). 

8th-century clergy
German beatified people